The Drug-Free Century Act was introduced to the United States Senate at the dawn of 1999.  Its primary purpose was to reduce the transportation and distribution of illegal drugs and to reduce domestic demand. The bill failed to proceed beyond the first stage in the process of becoming a law. Among other provisions, it would have increased the criminal penalty for violence committed along the United States border, introduced stricter sanctions for obstructing a boarding by maritime law patrol, or providing false information.

References

United States federal controlled substances legislation